Grażyna Krzanowska (born 1 March 1952) is a Polish composer. She was born in Legnica, Poland, and studied composition with Tadeusz Natanson at the State High School of Music in Wroclaw, where she graduated in 1976. After completing her studies, she took a teaching position at the Bielsko-Biala Music School. She married composer and accordionist Andrzej Krzanowski and often collaborated with him.

Works
Selected compositions include: 
Melodies, 1975
Cantata, 1975 
Passacaglia for Orchestra, 1976
Relief X for Sax quartet, 2002, dedicated to Andrzej Krzanowski

References

1952 births
20th-century classical composers
Living people
Polish classical composers
Polish music educators
Women classical composers
Women music educators
20th-century women composers
Polish women composers